Karl Ludvig Sundholm (20 March 1885 – 11 March 1955) was a Swedish rowing coxswain who competed in the 1912 Summer Olympics.

In 1912 he was the coxswain of the Swedish boat Vaxholm which was eliminated in the first round of the coxed four competition.

References

External links
profile

1885 births
1955 deaths
Swedish male rowers
Coxswains (rowing)
Olympic rowers of Sweden
Rowers at the 1912 Summer Olympics